Gilbert Ronald Bainbridge (1925–2003) was a British nuclear physicist, engineer and farmer.

Personal life and education
Gilbert Ronald Bainbridge was born 28 November 1925 at Felling, Gateshead, County Durham. He attended Jarrow County Secondary School, and matriculated at Durham University, where he earned a Bachelor of Arts with honors in physics, at Hatfield College in December 1946. His doctoral research there, on The Emission of Ionizing Radiation during a Spark Discharge, was supervised by W. A. Prowse, and in 1953 Bainbridge was awarded a PhD

In 1978, Bainbridge incorporated Cerrig Y Barcud farm in Anglesey, North Wales. He was also a Justice of the Peace.

He died 13 August 2003 at Glan Rhos Nursing Home, Anglesey.

Career 

In 1945 he began working for the Admiralty in Greenock, and he conducted torpedo research at Faslane.

He began lecturing in 1951 at Paisley Technical College in Glasgow, and in 1954 he began as a researcher at MacMaster University in Hamilton, Ontario in Canada. He researched light emissions from stars using mass spectrometry, funded by the United States Air Force Strategic Command.

He became Assistant Chief Engineer in 1957 in Warrington for the United Kingdom Atomic Energy Authority. Bainbridge was involved in the construction, control and development of laboratories and nuclear reactors at Aldermaston (Atomic Weapons Establishment), Berkeley nuclear power station, Calder Hall (see Sellafield), Dounreay Nuclear Power Development Establishment, Harwell (see Atomic Energy Research Establishment), Hinkley Point A nuclear power station, Oldbury nuclear power station, Tōkai mura, Trawsfynydd, Wylfa nuclear power station, Windscale (see Sellafield).

He also served as Health and Safety Executive and Representative to the British Council and Uratom. He was a Parliamentary Advisor and coordinator to the House of Lords Committee on Energy, and an Energy and Environmental consultant.

In 1972 he joined the faculty of University of Newcastle upon Tyne, where he was Director of The Energy Centre, and was named Wolfson Professor of Energy Studies. Bainbridge was also a Chartered Engineer as well as a Fellow of the Institute of Physics and a Fellow of the Institution of Electrical Engineers.

Publications

Books 
 Nuclear masses and their determination (1958)
 Energy Spectrum (1974)

Selected articles 
 "Atomic Masses of Ni58 and Ni60" (1956)
 "The Absorption of Ultraviolet Ionizing Radiation in Gases" (1956)
 "The Emission of Ionizing Radiation during a Spark Discharge" (1957)
 "Fission product decay heat" (1961)
 "Advanced AGR power stations" (1964)
 "Nuclear fuel supply by the U.K.A.E.A." (1967)
 "Nuclear options" (1974)
 "Energy in the OECD" (1975)
 "Rising to the Occasion" (1975)
 "Energetic perspective" (1975)
 "New Power Horizons" (1976)
 "Reprocessing nuclear fuel" (1978)
 "Design, Construction and Proving of Low-cost 5 kW Wind-Powered Turbine for Isolated Applications" (1979)
 "Comparative risks of different fuels in electricity generation" (1981)

References

Further reading
List of Published Works at National Archives
SAO/NASA Astrophysics Data System (ADS)

1925 births
2003 deaths
Alumni of Hatfield College, Durham
British physicists
Fellows of the Institute of Physics
Fellows of the Institution of Electrical Engineers